The Phoenix Cobras were a professional roller hockey team based in Phoenix, Arizona, United States that played in Roller Hockey International.

References

 
Roller Hockey International teams
Sports clubs established in 1994
Sports clubs disestablished in 1995
Sports in Phoenix, Arizona
1994 establishments in Arizona
1995 disestablishments in Arizona